Braian Damián Rodríguez Carballo (born 14 August 1986), known as Braian Rodríguez, is a Uruguayan professional footballer who plays as a striker for Brazilian club Juventude in Brazil.

Career
Born in Salto, Rodríguez made his senior debuts with local Cerro in Primera División, but later moved to Rentistas. In the 2007 summer he joined neighbouring Tacuarembó, and a year later he signed with local club Peñarol.

In January 2010 Rodríguez moved abroad for the first time of his career, joining Argentine Primera División side Tigre; six months later he moved to Peru, signing with Universidad San Martín. However, after being sparingly used in the campaign, he moved teams and countries again, joining Unión La Calera.

In January 2012 Rodríguez joined Huachipato, and netted 17 goals in 37 appearances in his first season for the club, being also crowned champions of Clausura tournament.

On 25 July 2013 Rodríguez joined La Liga side Real Betis, penning a four-year deal.

On 3 March 2015, Rodríguez was loaned to Brazilian club Grêmio, signing a contract until June 2016.

Career statistics

Honours

Club
Universidad San Martín
 Peruvian Primera División: 2010

Huachipato
 Primera División de Chile (1): 2012 Clausura

Pachuca
 CONCACAF Champions League: 2016–17

Notes

References

External links
 
 Braian Rodríguez at Football-Lineups
 

1986 births
Living people
Footballers from Salto, Uruguay
Association football forwards
Uruguayan footballers
Uruguayan expatriate footballers
Uruguay international footballers
C.A. Cerro players
Peñarol players
Tacuarembó F.C. players
Club Atlético Tigre footballers
Unión La Calera footballers
Everton de Viña del Mar footballers
Club Deportivo Universidad de San Martín de Porres players
Real Betis players
CD Numancia players
Grêmio Foot-Ball Porto Alegrense players
C.F. Pachuca players
Esporte Clube Juventude players
Campeonato Brasileiro Série B players
Uruguayan Primera División players
Argentine Primera División players
Peruvian Primera División players
Chilean Primera División players
La Liga players
Segunda División players
Expatriate footballers in Chile
Expatriate footballers in Argentina
Expatriate footballers in Peru
Expatriate footballers in Spain
Expatriate footballers in Brazil
Expatriate footballers in Mexico
Uruguayan expatriate sportspeople in Chile
Uruguayan expatriate sportspeople in Argentina
Uruguayan expatriate sportspeople in Peru
Uruguayan expatriate sportspeople in Spain
Uruguayan expatriate sportspeople in Brazil
Uruguayan expatriate sportspeople in Mexico